Fiães may refer to the following places in Portugal:

Fiães (Melgaço), a parish in the municipality of Melgaço
Fiães (Santa Maria da Feira), a parish in the municipality of Santa Maria da Feira 
Fiães (Trancoso), a parish in the municipality of Trancoso
Fiães (Valpaços), a parish in the municipality of Valpaços 
Fiães do Rio, a parish in the municipality of Montalegre

Other

Fiães Sport Clube, a sporting club played in the parish of Fiaes in the municipality of Santa Maria da Feira